Icesi University (. Originally the initials of Instituto Colombiano de Estudios Superiores de Incolda, «Colombian Institute of Higher Studies of Incolda») is a private university located in Cali, Colombia. The campus is located in the area of Pance, south of the city. Founded in 1979 by a group of businessmen in the region. Icesi University with a campus of 141,334 square meters, offers undergraduate programs, specializations, masters and doctorates.

In 2010, the Icesi University of Cali, was the first private University in southwestern Colombia, in the High Quality Institutional Accreditation. In 2015, the Ministry of National Education granted the renewal of the High Quality Institutional Accreditation, until 2021.

Icesi University has 13 accredited programs: Telematics Engineering, Systems Engineering, Industrial Engineering, Industrial Design, Business Administration, Economics and International Business, Law, Public Accounting and Finance, Pharmaceutical Chemistry, Economics and International Business, Media Design Interactive, International Marketing and Advertising, Psychology and Political Science.

The University had 14 research groups in Colciencias, seven of them are located (according to the newclassification of research groups of Colciencias) classified in category A1, 2 in category A,  3 in category B, and 1 in category C .1

Faculties
Today Icesi has five faculties and the School of Education. The five faculties are: Administrative and Economic Sciences, Engineering, Law and Social Sciences, Natural Sciences and Health Sciences; together they offer 29 undergraduate programs, 1 Doctoral Program, 25 master's programs and 21 medical-surgical specializations; all academic offerings are approved by the Ministry of National Education.

Faculty of Administrative and Economic Sciences

Undergraduate Programs:

 Business Administration with an emphasis in International Business
 Public Accounting and International Finance
 Economics
 Economics and International Business
 International Marketing and Advertising
 Finance

Postgraduate Programs:

 Icesi MBA
 MBA Global - Icesi Tulane
 Marketing
 Finance
 Management of Health Organizations
 Accounting and Taxation
 Doctorate: Business Economics

Faculty of Engineering

Undergraduate Programs:

 Systems Engineering
 Telematics Engineering
 Industrial Engineering
 Industrial design
 Interactive Media Design
 Biochemical Engineering

Postgraduate Programs:

 Informatics and Telecommunications Management
 Master's Degree in Computing and Telecommunications (Research)
 Industrial Engineering
 Master's Degree in Innovation Management
 Master's Degree in Project Management
 Master's Data Science

School of Law and Social Sciences

Undergraduate Programs:

 Law
 Anthropology
 Psychology
 Sociology
 Political Science with emphasis in International Relations
 Music

Postgraduate Programs:

 Law
 Government
 Psychosocial intervention
 Management for Social Innovation
 Social and Political Studies (Research)
 Master of Law (Research)

Faculty of Natural Sciences

Undergraduate Programs:

 Biology (with focus in Conservation and Molecular Biology / Biotechnology)
 Chemistry (with an emphasis in Biochemistry)
 Pharmaceutical Chemistry

Postgraduate Programs:

 Biotechnology
 Formulation of Chemicals and Derivatives
 Biotechnology (Research)
 Sciences - Biotechnology (Research)

Faculty of Health Sciences

Undergraduate Programs:

 Medicine

Postgraduate Programs:

 Arthroscopy • Cardiology • Pediatric Cardiology • Dermatology • Gynecology and Obstetrics • Hematology and Oncology • Internal Medicine Nephrology • Pediatrics • Liaison Psychiatry • Radiology and diagnostic images • Rheumatology • Abdominal Organ Transplant Surgery • Allergology • Head and neck surgery • Emergency Medicine • Psychiatry • Neurology • Neurosurgery • Pediatric Nephrology • Anesthesiology • Orthopedics and Traumatology • Infectious Disease

School of Education Sciences

Undergraduate Programs:

 Degree in Basic Primary Education
 Bachelor of Arts
 Bachelor of Foreign Languages (with emphasis in English)
 Degree in Natural Sciences
 Degree in social sciences
 Degree in Literature and Spanish Language

Postgraduate Programs:

 Education
 Master's Program in the Teaching of English as a Foreign Language
 Teaching English as a Foreign Language
 ICT-mediated Education (Virtual modality)

CDEE (Center for the Development of Entrepreneurship)

Postgraduate Programs:

 Enterprise Creation

Accreditations
Today Icesi has five faculties and the School of Education. The five faculties are: Administrative and Economic Sciences, Engineering, Law and Social Sciences, Natural Sciences and Health Sciences; together they offer 27 undergraduate programs, 1 Doctoral Program, 25 master's programs and 23 medical-surgical specializations; all academic offerings are approved by the Ministry of National Education and are recognized to be of the highest quality due to being endorsed by the following national and international accreditations:

• High Quality Institutional Accreditation certified by the National Accreditation Council of the Ministry of National Education.

• International Accreditation AACSB (Association to Advance Collegiate Schools of Business), an international institution that certifies the academic quality of business faculties around the world.

• Accreditation AMBA (Association of MBAs), an impartial authority established in London for the certification of the graduate programs in business faculties.

• ABET Accreditation (Accreditation Board for Engineering and Technology), one of the most important engineering program accreditation committees in the world, based in Baltimore, United States.

International experience 
The Office of International Relations, together with the faculties of the Icesi University, identifies, promotes, coordinates and evaluates academic and cultural programs, with the purpose of developing in its students the competencies to understand and act, in an effective way, in a globalized world. For this reason, it has established bilateral and multilateral cooperation agreements with universities, higher education institutions, research centers, international cooperation organizations and government entities to facilitate the process of internationalization of academic programs and the development of the global perspective of the students.

Reason why, it foments international experiences in the students through several modalities: realization of semesters of exchange in other universities, with which it has an agreement; internships and work practices abroad; as well as short programs of visits to other countries, either in missions, visits or summer programs, among others. Icesi currently has agreements in more than 870 international destinations (United States, Canada, Germany, Argentina, Australia, Austria, Belgium, Botswana, Brazil, Bulgaria, Chile, China, Korea, Costa Rica, Czech Republic, Denmark, United Arab Emirates , Ecuador, Spain, Estonia, Fiji, Finland, France, Ghana, Hungary, Iceland, India, Italy, Japan, Latvia, Lithuania, Mala, Morocco, Mexico, Netherlands, New Zealand, Nicaragua, Norway, Peru, Poland, Portugal , Puerto Rico, Russia, South Africa, Sweden, Switzerland, Thailand, United Kingdom, Uruguay)

References
↑ Colciencias. «Directorio de Grupos Colombianos de Investigación Científica y Tecnológica e Innovación». Consultado el 18 de octubre de 2018.

Icesi, Universidad
Educational institutions established in 1979
Buildings and structures in Cali
1979 establishments in Colombia